The 2023 Canterbury-Bankstown Bulldogs season is the 89th in the club's history. They will compete in the National Rugby League's 2023 Telstra Premiership. Cameron Ciraldo takes over as head coach of the team for his first season following the departure of Trent Barrett part way through the previous season.

Fixtures

The club will start 2023 with two pre-season trial matches against the Canberra Raiders and the Cronulla Sutherland Sharks in February before kicking off the regular season away to the Manly Warringah Sea Eagles in round one.

Regular season

Ladder

2023 squad

References

Canterbury-Bankstown Bulldogs seasons
Canterbury-Bankstown Bulldogs